Choqa Balk-e Khvajeh Bashi (also Romanized as Choqā Balk-e Khvājeh Bāshī, Cheqā Balak-e Khvājeh Bāshī, and Cheqā Balak Khvājeh Bāshī; also known as Cheqā Balak Qal‘eh, Cheqā Belek-e Qal‘eh, Chīa Balek Khwāja Bashi, and Chīā Malek Khvājeh Bāshī) is a village in Mahidasht Rural District, Mahidasht District, Kermanshah County, Kermanshah Province, Iran. At the 2006 census, its population was 222, in 55 families.

References 

Populated places in Kermanshah County